The 2019 Cook Islands Round Cup (also known as Vans Premiership due to sponsorship reasons) was the 46th recorded edition of the Cook Islands Round Cup, the top association football league of the Cook Islands organised by the Cook Islands Football Association. This season kicked off on 2 August 2019, and was competed by six teams from the island of Rarotonga in triple round-robin format. Tupapa Maraerenga won the league for the third straight year and qualified for the 2020 OFC Champions League, though they withdrew from that competition in the group stage.

Teams
Avatiu
Matavera
Nikao Sokattak
Puaikura
Titikaveka
Tupapa Maraerenga

League table

Results
ROUND 1 – 2 and 3 August 2019

Titikaveka 4–3 Tupapa Maraerenga  Avatiu 1–4 Nikao Sokattak   Puaikura 4–0 Matavera 

ROUND 2 – 9 and 10 August 2019

Tupapa Maraerenga 1–0 Matavera  Nikao Sokattak 2–2 Titikaveka  Avatiu 1-3 Puaikura (postponed due to rain) 

ROUND 3 – 16 and 17 August 2019

Tupapa Maraerenga 2–2 Puaikura  Nikao Sokattak 2–1 Matavera  Titikaveka 4–0 Avatiu

ROUND 4 - 23 and 24 August 2019

Puaikura 1-3 Nikao Sokattak  Tupapa Maraerenga 6-0 Avatiu  Titikaveka 3-0 Matavera 

ROUND 5 - 20 and 21 September 2019

Nikao Sokkatak 0-4 Tupapa Maraerenga  Matavera 1-0 Avatiu  Puaikura 0-1 Titikaveka 

ROUND 6 - 27 and 28 September 2019

Tupapa Marerenga 3-0 Titikaveka  Nikao Sokattak 13-2 Avatiu  Puaikura 1-1 Matavera 

ROUND 7 - 4 and 5 October 2019

Avatiu 1-5 Puaikura  Matavera 0-3 Tupapa Maraerenga  Titikaveka 0-4 Nikao Sokattak 

ROUND 8 - 11 and 12 October 2019

Matavera 2-10 Nikao Sokattak  Puaikura 1-3 Tupapa Maraerenga  Avatiu 3-0 Titikaveka 

ROUND 9 – 18 and 19 October 2019

Nikao Sokattak 2-1 Puaikura  Avatiu 1-4 Tupapa Maraerenga  Titikaveka 2-2 Matavera 

ROUND 10 - 25 and 26 October 2019

Nikao Sokattak 1-3 Tupapa Maraerenga  Avatiu 2-2 Matavera  Puaikura 4-2 Titikaveka 

ROUND 11 - 01 and 2 November 2019

Nikao Sokattak 3-1 Avatiu  Puaikura 0-3 Matavera  Tupapa Maraerenga 8-0 Titikaveka 

ROUND 12 - 07 and 8 November 2019

Nikao Sokattak 12-0 Titikaveka  Puaikura 1-1 Avatiu  Tupapa Maraerenga 9-0 Matavera

References

Cook Islands Round Cup seasons
Cook Islands
1